Brenton Roy Best (born 13 November 1963) is an Australian politician. He was elected to the Tasmanian House of Assembly in 1996 as a Labor member for Braddon.

Biography
Best was born on 13 November 1963 in Devonport, Tasmania.

At the age of 17 he began working as an engine driver, and was elected in 1987 to be the Tasmanian organiser of the Federated Engine Drivers and Fireman's Association of Australasia, and in 1994 to the Tasmanian Trades & Labor Council and Alderman Devonport City Council.

Electoral history
He was elected to the Tasmanian House of Assembly on 24 February 1996 for the Labor Party, and was defeated on 15 March 2014.

Career highlights

References

1963 births
Living people
Members of the Tasmanian House of Assembly
Australian Labor Party members of the Parliament of Tasmania
21st-century Australian politicians